Salters is a small unincorporated community in the southwest central portion of Williamsburg County, South Carolina, United States, in the state's Low Country region. The zip code is 29590 and the area code is 843. Charleston, South Carolina and Myrtle Beach, South Carolina are within driving distance of  Salters making for an enjoyable day trip to either. Forestry is the main industry in Williamsburg County. Nearby towns include Kingstree, Greeleyville, and Lane. Salters is the location of Federal Corrections Institution, Williamsburg. The Salters Plantation House was listed on the National Register of Historic Places in 2000.

References

External links
Federal Corrections Institution, Williamsburg

Unincorporated communities in Williamsburg County, South Carolina
Unincorporated communities in South Carolina